Stuart Davies may refer to:
 Stuart Davies (rugby union)
 Stuart Davies (engineer)

See also
 Stuart Davis (disambiguation)